Tadlowe is a surname. Notable people with the surname include:

William Tadlowe (by 1495–1556), English politician
George Tadlowe, English politician